Triads, Yardies and Onion Bhajees is a 2003 British crime film directed by Sarjit Bains, telling the story of a hitman working in London. The film stars real life ex-gangster and underworld don Dave Courtney. Brainchild of Manish Patel, who plays the role of Singh, the story's protagonist, Triads, Yardies and Onion Bhajees was showcased in a BBC Two documentary on the making of the film.

The film draws upon the imagery of Hindu deity Kali, traditionally invoked to vanquish evil, with the three gangs being likened to modern-day thugees. After its Cannes showcase the film was optioned by 4 Digital Media and went on UK wide release through the independent cinema network.

Plot
Triads, Yardies and Onion Bhajees is primarily an action movie but it has a mythological and spiritual vein running through it. The character of Chacha worships the Hindu Goddess Kali, and a statue of Kali is shown both in his home and in his office. Chacha is seen praying to the Goddess in a temple.

Chachas influence and teachings have also influenced members of his gang. The image of Kali can be seen in the homes of his various gang members. The smoke emanating from the incense surrounding the Kali statue in the temple is deemed to be holy, and Chacha names his crime syndicate "The Holy Smokes". The film suggests that the Goddess Kali is watching the proceedings unfold before her and ultimately will decide who lives and who dies.

Cast
Manish Patel as Singh 
Dave Courtney as Mad Dave
Jass Bassi as Chacha
Jonathan Reason as Greaves
Peter Rnic as Big Kev
Jamille Riverol as Tia
Ashvin Kumar Joshi as Jaz
Fran Labbe as Abz
Sukie Ghajminger as Rocky
Yasmine Maya as Trudy
Native as Lloyd
Charles Udemezue as Errol
Richard Angol as Rufus
Peter Peralta as Billy Chan
Alex Fung as Li Fung
Ines Boughanmi as Chacha's daughter

References

External links

2003 films
2000s crime films 
British crime films
 
British Indian films
British independent films
Films shot in London
Films set in London
2003 directorial debut films
2000s English-language films
2000s British films